Kenneth Kelly (born 7 September 1952) is an English former professional rugby league footballer who played in the 1960s, 1970s and 1980s.

Playing career

International honours
Ken Kelly won caps for England while at Warrington in 1979 against Wales, in 1981 against France, and Wales, and won caps for Great Britain while at St Helens in 1972 against France (2 matches), while at Warrington in 1980 against New Zealand, and in 1982 against Australia.

Challenge Cup Final appearances
Ken Kelly played  in St. Helens' 16–13 victory over Leeds in the 1972 Challenge Cup Final during the 1971–72 season at Wembley Stadium, London on Saturday 13 May 1972.

County Cup Final appearances
Ken Kelly played , was captain in Warrington's 26–10 victory over Wigan in the 1980 Lancashire County Cup Final during the 1980–81 season at Knowsley Road, St. Helens, on Saturday 4 October 1980, played , was captain, and scored a try  in the 16–0 victory over St. Helens in the 1982 Lancashire County Cup Final during the 1982–83 season at Central Park, Wigan on Saturday 23 October 1982, and played  in the 8–34 defeat by Wigan in the 1985 Lancashire County Cup Final during the 1985–86 season at Knowsley Road, St. Helens, on Sunday 13 October 1985,

BBC2 Floodlit Trophy Final appearances
Ken Kelly played  in St. Helens' 8–2 victory over Rochdale Hornets in the 1971 BBC2 Floodlit Trophy Final during the 1971–72 season at Headingley Rugby Stadium, Leeds on Tuesday 14 December 1971.

Player's No.6/John Player/John Player Special Trophy Final appearances
Ken Kelly was an interchange/substitute in Bradford Northern's 3–2 victory over Widnes in the 1974–75 Player's No.6 Trophy Final during the 1974–75 season at Wilderspool Stadium, Warrington on Saturday 25 January 1975, played left-, i.e. number 4, in Warrington's 9–4 victory over Widnes in the 1977–78 Players No.6 Trophy Final during the 1977–78 season at Knowsley Road, St. Helens on Saturday 28 January 1978, played  (replaced by interchange/substitute Eddie Hunter) in the 4–16 defeat by Widnes in the 1978–79 John Player Trophy Final during the 1978–79 season at Knowsley Road, St. Helens on Saturday 28 April 1979, played  in the 12–5 victory over Barrow in the 1980–81 John Player Trophy Final during the 1980–81 season at Central Park, Wigan on Saturday 24 January 1981, and played  in the 4–18 defeat by Wigan in the 1986–87 John Player Special Trophy Final during the 1986–87 season at Burnden Park, Bolton on Saturday 10 January 1987.

Honoured at Warrington Wolves
Ken Kelly is a Warrington Wolves Hall of Fame inductee.

References

External links
Profile at saints.org.uk
Photograph "Ken Kelly makes a break" at rlhp.co.uk
Photograph "Daylight training" at rlhp.co.uk
Photograph "Second Test Match" at rlhp.co.uk
Photograph "Ken Kelly races over" at rlhp.co.uk
Photograph "Half time talk" at rlhp.co.uk
Photograph "Joe Phillips memorial trophy team 1975" at rlhp.co.uk
Photograph "No way through" at rlhp.co.uk
Statistics at wolvesplayers.thisiswarrington.co.uk

1952 births
Living people
Bradford Bulls players
England national rugby league team players
English rugby league players
Great Britain national rugby league team players
Lancashire rugby league team players
Liverpool City (rugby league) players
Rugby league five-eighths
Rugby league halfbacks
Rugby league players from St Helens, Merseyside
St Helens R.F.C. players
Warrington Wolves players